Die Affäre Semmeling was a 2002 German miniseries, broadcast on ZDF, directed by Dieter Wedel. It starred Mario Adorf as Walter 'Beton-Walter' Wegener, Robert Atzorn as Dr. Klaus Hennig, Heinz Hoenig as Axel Ropert, Stefan Kurt as Sigi Semmeling and Heike Makatsch as Silke Semmeling.

External links
 

ZDF original programming
2002 German television series debuts
2002 German television series endings
Television shows set in Hamburg
German-language television shows